The Sri Lanka Army Ordnance Corps (SLAOC) is a combat support corps of the Sri Lanka Army. The role of the corps is the procurement, receipt, storage, accounting, maintenance, control, issue and disposal of ordnance stores. It is made up of seven regular ordnance battalions, three Base Depots, one volunteer (reserve) ordnance battalion, and many independent ordnance depots. It is headquartered at the Regimental Centre, Dombagoda.

History

1949-1972 
The Regiment of the Sri Lanka Army Ordnance became a Corps on 14 October 1949. With the raising of Ceylon Army in 1949, munitions of the Royal Ordnance were accepted and stacked in government storerooms. The Ordnance storeroom was established on 1 February 1950 in Kirulapone.

Major B G Brecher was the first Director of the Sri Lanka Ordnance. He was dispatched to Sri Lanka on 11 March 1950. The initial plan was laid down by him with the advice of Wolly Rowi. Sri Lanka Corps of Ordnance was officially established as a Unit on 29 March 1950 with 2 Commissioned Officers, 2 Warrant Officers, 1 Staff Sergeant, and 3 Sergeants under the direction of Major B G Brecher. Its founder members were Captain ED Ebert, Lieutenant AADB Perera, WO I, BC Waisse, WO I, PM Rathnayake, Staff Sergeant Wickramaseka WEB, Sergeant Karunathilaka MLWB, Sergeant Ebert JAVD, Sergeant De Alwis CS.

Cylon Ordnance Corps was the youngest Commonwealth member to have been raised according to Royal Ordnance. Other ranks were first recruited to the Corps on 7 February 1950. During the initial years, the Corps operated as two units - the Directorate of Ordnance Services was at the Army Headquarters while the Ordnance Depot was located in Kirulapone.

Policy affairs, planning and inventorying were the responsibility of the Ordnance Directorate, while acceptance of goods, stocking, and issuance were the responsibilities of the issuing depot. The first-ever stock was what the Army purchased from the Royal Ordnance.

An Arms and Ammunition unit was established at Army Headquarters on 23 March 1950. Its first staff included one officer and three other ranks. As the responsibilities assigned to them were growing, the first ordnance depot was established as part Sri Lanka Electrical Mechanical Engineering Corp. This unit functioned according to the Royal Ordnance Depot which was part of the Royal Electrical and Mechanical Engineering Corps.

The Kirulapone Ordnance Depot was shifted to Panagoda Army Cantonment, Panagoda in July 1955 where it remained. In March 1956, the Sri Lanka Corps of Ordnance was separated from the Royal Army Ordnance Corps. The officers, therefore, returned to their country, and in the same month, Lt Col DFT Abeysinghe was appointed the unit's first Commanding Officer. At the time, the Corps consisted of 6 officers and 176 other ranks.

Thereafter, the SLAOC was functioning jointly with the Ordnance Director under the supervision of a senior Stock control officer and accounts officer. All duties pertaining to SLAOC were performed under the SLAOC Directorate and the Commanding Officer SLAOC was answerable to the Army Commander on all technical affairs related to ordnance services.

Units

Regular Army
School of ordnance at Dombagoda - Commandant COL W M A N Warnasooriya ato
Sri Lanka Army Ordnance Factory at Veyangoda - Commandant LT COL W K S P Walakanda USP ato Lsc
Base Ordnance Depot at Ragama - Commandant COL A G C R Amarasinghe USP ato
Central Arms and Ammunition Depot at Veyangoda - Commandant COL R A P A B Dissanayake AATO 
Army Clothing Depot at Veyangoda - Commandant LT COL V P A P Hapuarchchi ato
1st Ordnance Battalion at Panagoda - Commanding Officer LT COL G A I S Nanayakkara AATO
2nd Ordnance Battalion at Anuradapura - Commanding Officer Lt Col E M T P G W K Ekanayake USP ato
3rd Ordnance Battalion at Mineriya - Commanding Officer MAJ W D P K WITHANA psc AATO
5th Ordnance Battalion at Kankasanturei - Commanding Officer Lt Col S D Range USP AATO Lsc
6th Ordnance Battalion at Kilinochchi - Commanding Officer Maj P H S N K Paskuwaell USP ato Lsc
7th Ordnance Battalion at Mulathiv - Commanding Officer Maj A M R H B Abeysinghe USP AATO Lsc

Volunteers
4th Ordnance Battalion at Kandy (Formed on 1 December 1995) - Commanding Officer MAJ N G J P THILAKARATNE psc AATO

Notable members
 Brigadier G. R. Jayasinghe - founder of the Sri Lanka Rifle Corps

Order of precedence

External links and sources
 Sri Lanka Army
 Sri Lanka Army Ordnance Corps
 ordnan cecricket

Ordnance Corps
Ordnance Corps